Return to Mysterious Island 2: Mina's Fate is a 2009 adventure video game developed by Kheops Studio and published by MC2 France under their Microïds label. It is a sequel to the 2004 video game Return to Mysterious Island, and is again based upon the 1875 book by Jules Verne, The Mysterious Island.

Gameplay 
The character of Mina is back, but now her monkey, Jep, becomes the second playable character; the player will switch back and forth between the two. Each character has their own abilities—Jep, for example, can go to inaccessible places and communicate with other monkeys, whereas Mina can read documents and use complex tools.

The game could also be synchronised with the player's iPhone, allowing parts of the game, like puzzles, to be completed away from the PC, and then reintegrated again. Players are also able to communicate with other players online.

Plot 
During the game the player will fight for their survival on the island, and they must also save the island from an environmental disaster. Return to Mysterious Island II starts with the crash of the helicopter that attempted the rescue of Mina. She survives the crash, but is still on the island. An unknown disease suddenly begins to attack plants, then animals. Mina searches the island, and discovers an external source of pollution. It appears that the only way to save the island is to turn the shield back on, which would prevent her from returning to civilization, like Captain Nemo.

Development 
On November 25, 2008 Microïds announced that a sequel to Return to Mysterious Island had been in development by Kheops Studio since April 2008.  On 14 August an email was sent to the Microïds mailing list noting that the game had been released for download in English and French for PC and iPhone.

The game website also displays the Cryo Interactive logo, a company which Microïds acquired in 2008, from the publisher of the original Return to Mysterious Island, The Adventure Company. The game website also encompasses Microïds other games which are based on the works of Jules Verne; The Secret of the Nautilus and Journey to the Moon.

Reception

Return to Mysterious Island 2 holds a 75% rating on GameRankings.

References

External links 
 
 Return to Mysterious Island 2: Mina's Fate at MobyGames

2009 video games
Adventure games
IOS games
First-person adventure games
MacOS games
Microïds games
Return to Mysterious Island (video game series)
Point-and-click adventure games
Video games developed in France
Video games set on islands
Video games featuring female protagonists
Video games based on works by Jules Verne
Kheops Studio games
Windows games
Works based on The Mysterious Island